Shoreham railway station serves Shoreham in Kent, England. Train services are provided by Thameslink.

History
Shoreham Station was opened by the London, Chatham and Dover Railway on 2 June 1862, the same day as the Swanley to Sevenoaks Bat & Ball opened. The line was initially single track - the second track opened in 1863.

The ticket office here was closed in 1992, having been staffed only during part of the day; these days, a PERTIS passenger-operated ticket machine issues 'Permits to Travel' - which are exchanged on-train or at staffed stations for travel tickets - and is located on the Ashford-bound platform. This has since been replaced by a modern ticket machine.

The platforms are connected by a concrete footbridge - a typical product of the Southern Railway concrete factory at Exmouth Junction.

Facilities
There are shelters with benches on both platforms as well as a ticket machine and modern help point. There is step free access to the Sevenoaks bound platform but the London bound platform is only accessible via the stepped footbridge. There is a small (free) car park at the station entrance. The station is unstaffed.

Services
Off-peak, all services at Shoreham are operated by Thameslink using Class 700 EMUs. 

The typical off-peak service in trains per hour is:
 2 tph to London Blackfriars via 
 2 tph to 

During the peak hours, the service to London Blackfriars is extended to and from  via .

Southeastern services on the Maidstone East Line call here occasionally during times of service disruption or engineering work.

Connections
The station is served on Monday-Saturday by the route 2 bus to Swanley and Sevenoaks.

References

External links

Railway stations in Kent
DfT Category F1 stations
Former London, Chatham and Dover Railway stations
Railway stations in Great Britain opened in 1862
Railway stations served by Southeastern
Buildings and structures in Sevenoaks District
1862 establishments in England
Railway stations served by Govia Thameslink Railway